John Callender (MB Chb, MD, MRCPsych, FRCPsych) is a Scottish psychiatrist and philosopher born in 1954.

Callender graduated from the University of Glasgow in 1977. He is a consultant psychiatrist at the Royal Cornhill Hospital in Aberdeen, the associate director of Grampian Medical Health Services and an Honorary Senior Lecturer at the University of Aberdeen. He was one of the four entry-points for transgender healthcare in Scotland, serving the Grampian, Orkney and Shetland areas, but has now retired.

His philosophical research is primarily focused on the application of Kantian ethics and aesthetics to psychiatric disorders and therapeutic treatment. He has published articles in the Journal of Medical Ethics, Clinical Psychology and Psychotherapy and Philosophy, Psychiatry, & Psychology.

He lives in Aberdeen with his wife and three children.

Papers 
Ethics and aims in psychotherapy: a contribution from Kant
The Role of Aesthetic Judgments in Psychotherapy

Books

References

1954 births
Living people
Academics of the University of Aberdeen
Scottish philosophers
Scottish psychiatrists
Fellows of the Royal College of Psychiatrists
20th-century British philosophers
21st-century British philosophers
20th-century Scottish medical doctors
21st-century Scottish medical doctors